Cheruthuruthy Velappan Sreeraman (7 February 1931 – 11 October 2007) was an Indian writer who wrote short stories in Malayalam. He was the Vice Chairman of Kerala Sahitya Akademi. C. V. Sreeraman's stories stand foremost core to the theme, as exemplified by his Anayasena Maranam (Dying an Easy Death) and Railway Palangal (The Rails). He won the prestigious Kendra Sahitya Academy Award in 1999 for his collection of short stories Sreeramante Kathakal and Kerala Sahitya Academy Award for the collection Vasthuhara.

Biography
Born on 7 February 1931, at Porkulam, Kerala to Velappan and Janaki, Sreeraman spent a part of his childhood in Sri Lanka. He studied in Government High School, Kunnamkulam; T.M. H. S., Perumbilavu; St. Thomas College, Thrissur and St. Aloysius College, Mangalore and took degree in law from the Madras Law College.

For seven years, he worked in the Rehabilitation Department of the Andaman and Nicobar islands, which provided the theme for some his stories. A Communist right from his student days, Sreeraman served as the president of Chovvanur panchayat for seven years and was actively associated with the pro-Communist Party of India (Marxist) cultural outfit Purogamana Kala Sahitya Sangham. He was a member of the Kerala Sahitya Akademi Executive Committee from 1988 to 1991. His residence in Kongunoor near Kunnamkulam, Thrissur was a hub for Malayalam writers from the district.

Sreeraman died on 10 October 2007 at Jubilee Mission hospital in Thrissur. He was being treated for liver and renal problems. He was 76 and survived by wife and three children.

Writing
Sreeraman wrote his first story Oru Puthiya Samararoopam while studying at St. Thomas College, Thrissur. His works include Puthuma Illathavarude Nagaram, Chidambaram, Kshurasyadhara, Theerthakkavadi, Dukhitharude Dukham, Puramkazhchakal, Vasthuhara, Chakshu Sravanagalasthamam, Pondhan Mada, Sheema Thampuran and Entosy Valiamma. His stories were translated into English and German, and several Indian languages, including Hindi, Bengali, Tamil, Kannada, Telugu, Marathi and Oriya. The visual quality of his narration attracted filmmakers. Vasthuhara, Chidambaram (G. Aravindan), Purushartham (K. R. Mohanan) and Ponthan Mada (T. V. Chandran) were based on Sreeraman's stories.

Bibliography
The following are the works published by C. V. Sreeraman.

See also
 C. V. Sreeraman Award

References

1931 births
2007 deaths
People from Thrissur district
Writers from Thrissur
Malayalam-language writers
Malayalam novelists
Malayalam short story writers
Recipients of the Sahitya Akademi Award in Malayalam
Recipients of the Kerala Sahitya Akademi Award
20th-century Indian short story writers
20th-century Indian novelists
Indian male short story writers
Indian male novelists
Novelists from Kerala
20th-century Indian male writers